Two ships of the Royal Navy have borne the name HMS Magic. A third was planned, but renamed before being launched:

 HMS Magic was to have been a  destroyer. She was renamed  before being launched in 1915.
She was sold in 1921.
  was a  launched in 1943 and sunk in 1944.

See also
 
 

Royal Navy ship names